William Geoffrey Collins (born April 10, 1971) is an American football coach and former player. Collins was the head coach at Georgia Tech from December 7, 2018, to September 25, 2022. He was previously the head coach at Temple University, and had served in the past as defensive coordinator for the University of Florida and Mississippi State University.

Coaching career

Early career
Collins graduated from Rockdale County High School in Conyers, Georgia, where he played for coach and mentor Bob Smith.  He went on to play football at Western Carolina University.  Following his graduation, Collins served as a student assistant at Western Carolina, his alma mater, during the 1993 and 1994 seasons. Following a year coaching high school, Collins became the linebacker coach for Fordham in 1996 before becoming the defensive coordinator at Albright College from 1997 through 1998. Collins left Albright to become a graduate assistant at Georgia Tech under George O'Leary for the 1999 and 2000 seasons. Following two years in the GA position, Georgia Tech promoted Collins to tight ends coach at for the 2001 season. Collins returned to his alma mater to become Western Carolina's defensive coordinator from 2002 through 2005 before returning to Georgia Tech in 2006 as the Director of Player Personnel. After a year at Alabama as the Director of Player Personnel, Collins was terminated and reunited with O'Leary at UCF as linebackers coach and recruiting coordinator from 2008 through 2009.

FIU (2010)
Collins served as the defensive coordinator for Florida International during the 2010 season. Collins' defense led the Sun Belt Conference in total defense, scoring defense and turnover margin.

Mississippi State (2011–2014) 
Collins coached at Mississippi State from 2011 through 2014. During that time, Collins coached All-American Fletcher Cox, who was drafted in the first round of the 2012 NFL Draft. Upon being promoted to defensive coordinator in 2013, Collins helped lead a Bulldogs team that finished in the Top 5 in the SEC in total defense, rushing defense and passing defense. In 2014, Collins' Mississippi State defense led the SEC in sacks and had the conference's No. 1 Red Zone defense en route to a 10-3 record.

Florida (2015–2016) 
Collins spent two years as the defensive coordinator at Florida underneath Jim McElwain. While with the Gators, Collins oversaw a defense that ranked No. 6 in scoring defense in 2016 and No. 11 in 2015. During the 2015 season, Collins' defense became just the seventh team in the last 20 years to not allow a touchdown against three FBS Power 5 schools on the road in the same season. During his time at Florida, Collins coached five defensive players that were drafted in the 2016 NFL Draft and produced a consensus All-American in Vernon Hargreaves. Hargreaves and safety Keanu Neal were drafted in the first round of the 2016 NFL Draft.

Following the 2015 season, Collins was a candidate to replace O'Leary as the head coach at UCF. Collins interviewed for the position that ultimately went to Scott Frost.

Temple (2017–2018) 
Collins secured his first head coaching job in December 2016 when he was named Matt Rhule's successor at Temple. Collins had previously worked alongside Rhule at Albright College and Western Carolina.

In Collins' first season, Temple went 7–6 and won the 2017 Gasparilla Bowl, the program's first bowl win since 2011 and just its third bowl win overall.

In his second season, the Owls started off 0-2 but finished the regular season 8–4 overall and 7–1 in conference play. The Owls qualified for the 2018 Independence Bowl as a result. Along the way, Collins surpassed Steve Addazio as the winningest Temple coach over the first two seasons of their tenure at the school.

Georgia Tech (2019–2022) 
On December 7, 2018, Collins was named the 20th head coach of Georgia Tech football. Collins won three games in each of his first three seasons with the Yellow Jackets, including famously losing to The Citadel, which ran the triple option that Collins has criticized. In 2021, Collins ended his losing streak to FCS opponents when Georgia Tech defeated Kennesaw State, a team who was playing with their fourth string quarterback after a series of unfortunate incidents befell all other eligible quarterbacks. Collins never won back to back games at Georgia Tech. Following a 1-3 start to the 2022 season, and being out scored 210-20 over the final 5 games of his tenure against FBS opponents, Collins was relieved of coaching duties by the Yellow Jackets. Assistant head coach Brent Key took over as interim head coach.

Head coaching record

References

External links

 Temple profile

1971 births
Living people
American football linebackers
Alabama Crimson Tide football coaches
Albright Lions football coaches
FIU Panthers football coaches
Florida Gators football coaches
Fordham Rams football coaches
Georgia Tech Yellow Jackets football coaches
Mississippi State Bulldogs football coaches
Temple Owls football coaches
UCF Knights football coaches
Western Carolina Catamounts football coaches
Western Carolina Catamounts football players
High school football coaches in North Carolina
People from Conyers, Georgia
Sportspeople from the Atlanta metropolitan area
Coaches of American football from Georgia (U.S. state)
Players of American football from Georgia (U.S. state)